Cryptosula is a genus of bryozoans belonging to the family Cryptosulidae.

The genus has almost cosmopolitan distribution.

Species:

Cryptosula cylindrica 
Cryptosula okadai 
Cryptosula pallasiana 
Cryptosula reticulata 
Cryptosula terebrata 
Cryptosula zavjalovensis

References

Bryozoan genera
Cheilostomatida